Erythrolophus is a monotypic moth genus in the family Geometridae. Its only species, Erythrolophus fascicorpus, is found in Assam, India. Both the genus and species were described by Swinhoe in 1892.

References

Sterrhinae
Monotypic moth genera